The Bad Lieutenants are a United Kingdom skydiving team started in 2006.  They began as a freeflying team and competed at both national and international level until in 2006 and 2007.  In 2008 they took a break due to Matthew O'Riordan's ACL injury, and in 2009 reformed with two new members as a vertical formation skydiving team.  Based on their performance in the World Cup in 2009, coming third, they have received considerable support from the British Parachute Association and skydiving manufacturers.

The VFS team are sponsored by Target Skysports, a dropzone located at the Lincolnshire village of Hibaldstow.

Team members 
Matthew O'Riordan – Title: Lieutenant Rabbi, Jumps: 2,500+, Lives: London, UK.  Matt's profile

Jim Harris – Title: Lieutenant Jesus, Jumps: 7,000+, Lives: Seville, Spain.  Jim's profile

James Davies – Title: Lieutenant Hammer, Jumps: 2,500+, Lives: London, UK.  James' profile

Martin Reynolds – Title: Lieutenant Pie, Jumps: 3,500+, Lives: Leamington Spa, UK.  Martin's profile

Daniel Parker – Title: Lieutenant Football, Jumps: 3,500, Lives: Manchester, UK.  Daniel's profile

Photos

External links 
 

Parachuting in the United Kingdom